Abaúj is traditional region of Hungary, in Borsod-Abaúj-Zemplén county. It is the southern half of the former historical county of Abaúj.

 

Regions of Hungary
Geography of Borsod-Abaúj-Zemplén County